Chaetostoma spondylus is a freshwater species of catfish in the family Loricariidae and the genus Chaetostoma. It is a demersal fish with a pH range of about 6–7.1.  It is native to South America, where it occurs in the Chotano River, the Huancabamba River, the Sendamal River, and the Utcubamba, which are mountain tributaries of the Marañón River located at around 1500 to 2000 meters (4921 to 6562 ft) above sea level. These rivers are, by extension, part of the Amazon River basin in Peru.

The species is typically found in streams and rapids with a high gradient, specifically in areas with a boulder substrate. It reaches 13.1 cm (5.2 inches) SL. C. spondylus is thought to prefer temperatures of 23 to 27 °C (73 to 80 °F).

References

spondylus
Fish described in 2015